NGC 178 is a Magellanic spiral galaxy in the constellation of Cetus. The compiler of the New General Catalogue, John Louis Emil Dreyer noted that NGC 178 was "faint, small, much extended 0°, brighter middle". It was discovered on November 3, 1885 by Ormond Stone.

Due to its high rate of star formation NGC 178 is a starburst galaxy. The peculiar morphology of this galaxy may be a sign of it being a galaxy merger.

See also 
 Spiral galaxy 
 List of NGC objects (1–1000)

References

External links 
 
 
 SEDS

0178
IC objects
2349
Cetus (constellation)
18851103
Discoveries by Ormond Stone
Dwarf spiral galaxies
Starburst galaxies